This Time – The First Four Years is the first official greatest hits album by British new wave group Culture Club, released by Virgin Records on 6 April 1987. Its release came one year after the band had split up.

Overview
The compilation exclusively includes, in its vinyl edition, Culture Club's most successful hits.  The one track which was never available in single format is "Black Money" (originally on the band's second album, Colour by Numbers), which was intended to be released to promote this collection, but never actually came out. The album includes a wide selection of tracks taken from all their albums (including more than half the tracks from the Colour by Numbers album), as well as the group's contribution to the Electric Dreams film soundtrack; "Love Is Love". For many countries, it was the first time that their hit single "Time (Clock of the Heart)" was included on an album.

Two additional tracks are featured on the CD and cassette version: the remix of "I'll Tumble 4 Ya" and the US 12" medley of "It's a Miracle" and "Miss Me Blind".

The bulk of these tracks would be re-issued on numerous compilations for years after.

Track listing
 "Karma Chameleon" - 4:01 (O'Dowd/Hay/Craig/Moss/Pickett) from Colour by Numbers
 "Church of the Poison Mind" - 3:31 (O'Dowd/Hay/Craig/Moss) from Colour by Numbers
 "Miss Me Blind" - 4:29 (O'Dowd/Hay/Craig/Moss) from Colour by Numbers
 "Time (Clock of the Heart)" - 3:43 (O'Dowd/Hay/Craig/Moss) from Kissing to Be Clever (US Edition)
 "It's a Miracle" - 3:25 (O'Dowd/Hay/Craig/Moss/Pickett) from Colour by Numbers
 "Black Money" - 5:19 (O'Dowd/Hay/Craig/Moss) from Colour by Numbers
 "Do You Really Want to Hurt Me" - 4:24 (O'Dowd/Hay/Craig/Moss) from ''Kissing to Be Clever
 "Move Away" - 4:10 (O'Dowd/Hay/Craig/Moss/Pickett) from From Luxury to Heartache
 "I'll Tumble 4 Ya" - 2:35 (O'Dowd/Hay/Craig/Moss) from Kissing to Be Clever
 "Love Is Love" - 3:52 (O'Dowd/Hay/Craig/Moss) from Electric Dreams
 "The War Song" - 3:59 (O'Dowd/Hay/Craig/Moss) from Waking Up with the House on Fire
 "Victims" - 4:55 (O'Dowd/Hay/Craig/Moss) from Colour by Numbers
 "I'll Tumble 4 Ya" (U.S. 12" Remix) - 4:40 (O'Dowd/Hay/Craig/Moss) [CD/MC bonus track] from Kissing to Be Clever
 "It's a Miracle/Miss Me Blind" (U.S. 12" Remix) - 9:12 (O'Dowd/Hay/Craig/Moss/Pickett) [CD/MC bonus track] from Colour by Numbers

Personnel

Band/musicians
Boy George: lead vocals and lyrics
Roy Hay: guitars, keyboards, sitar, synth guitar
Mikey Craig: bass
Jon Moss: drums and percussion
Helen Terry: female lead and background vocals
 for the other musicians, see Culture Club's first four albums

Staff/production
Steve Levine: production, except track 8 
Arif Mardin, Lew Hahn: production on track 8
Assorted iMaGes: album cover
David Levine, Jamie Morgan, Mark LeBon, Kate Garner, Stevie Hughes: photography
Mitaka: booklet Japanese translation
 for the other members of staff and production, see Culture Club's first four albums

Release details

Charts

References

External links
 AllMusic review
 FnacMusic.com where it is possible to listen to short samples of all tracks on the collection 
 Amazon.com Use the "Search" box for infos on Culture Club's albums and collections
 Artist Direct Use "Search" box for infos on Culture Club's albums and collections
 Rate Your Music Use search box for infos on Culture Club's albums and collections

1987 compilation albums
Culture Club albums
Albums produced by Steve Levine
Virgin Records compilation albums
Epic Records compilation albums